Sue Clayton may refer to:
Sue Clayton (Coronation Street), character in 1985 in UK tv soap opera Coronation Street
Sue Clayton (film director), British film director